Lone Hand Wilson is a 1920 American silent Western film. It stars Lester Cuneo in the title role. Other actors include Annette DeFoe (playing Lolita Hansen) and Thomas Randall.

Plot
The romance of Lone Hand Wilson (Cuneo) with Madge Walker (Gordon) is complicated when he is falsely accused of murdering her father (Gastrock).

Cast
 Lester Cuneo as Lone Hand Wilson
 Grace Gordon as Madge Walker
 Annette DeFoe as Lolita Hansen
 Phil Gastrock as Andy Walker (credited as Philip Gastrock)
 Thomas Randall (Undetermined role)

References

External links 

 
 

1920 films
1920 Western (genre) films
American black-and-white films
Silent American Western (genre) films
1920s American films
1920s English-language films